The Public Health Act  1936 (26 Geo 5 & 1 Edw 8 c 49) is an Act of the Parliament of the United Kingdom. As of 1973, it was the principal Act on the subject of public health. Its provisions repeal and re-enact most earlier statutes on that subject. It is one of the Public Health Acts 1936 and 1937.

Part I

Section 1
In section 1(1)(a), the words "or community" were repealed by sections 22(3) and 66(8) of, and paragraph 3(1) of Schedule 9 to, and Schedule 18 to, the Local Government (Wales) Act 1994.

Section 2
This section was repealed by section 78(b) of, and Schedule 3 to the Public Health (Control of Disease) Act 1984.

Section 3
This section was repealed by section 78(b) of, and Schedule 3 to the Public Health (Control of Disease) Act 1984. The proviso to section 3(2) was repealed by section 272(1) of, and Schedule 30 to, the Local Government Act 1972. Section 3(3) was repealed by section 272(1) of, and Schedule 30 to, the Local Government Act 1972.

Section 4
This section was repealed by section 78(b) of, and Schedule 3 to the Public Health (Control of Disease) Act 1984. The proviso to section 4(1) was repealed by section 272(1) of, and Schedule 30 to, the Local Government Act 1972. Section 4(2) was repealed by section 272(1) of, and Schedule 30 to, the Local Government Act 1972.

Section 5
This section was repealed by section 78(b) of, and Schedule 3 to the Public Health (Control of Disease) Act 1984.

Section 6
Section 6(3), from "and power" onwards, was repealed by section 48(2) of, and Part II of the Seventh Schedule to, the Charities Act 1960.

Section 7
The proviso to section 7(1) was repealed by section 272(1) of, and Schedule 30 to, the Local Government Act 1972.

Section 8
This section was repealed by section 272(1) of, and Schedule 30 to, the Local Government Act 1972. Section 8(2), from "and power" onwards, was repealed by section 48(2) of, and Part II of the Seventh Schedule to, the Charities Act 1960.

Section 9
In section 9(1), the words "port health district, or a" were repealed by section 78(b) of, and Schedule 3 to the Public Health (Control of Disease) Act 1984. In section 9(2), the words "the port health authority or" were repealed by section 78(b) of, and Schedule 3 to the Public Health (Control of Disease) Act 1984. In section 9(3), the words "port health district" were repealed by section 78(b) of, and Schedule 3 to the Public Health (Control of Disease) Act 1984.

Section 10
The words "port health authority or" were repealed by section 78(b) of, and Schedule 3 to the Public Health (Control of Disease) Act 1984.

Sections 11 to 13
Sections 11 to 13 were repealed by section 272(1) of, and Schedule 30 to, the Local Government Act 1972.

Part II

Section 14
This section was repealed by section 40(3) of, and Schedule 9 to, the Water Act 1973.

Section 15
This section was repealed by section 190(3) of, and Part I of Schedule 27 to, the Water Act 1989.

Section 16
This section was repealed by section 40(3) of, and Schedule 9 to, the Water Act 1973.

Sections 17 and 18
These sections were repealed by section 3(1) of, and Part I of Schedule 3 to, the Water Consolidation (Consequential Provisions) Act 1991.

Section 19
This section was repealed by section 3(1) of, and Part I of Schedule 3 to, the Water Consolidation (Consequential Provisions) Act 1991. In section 19(2), the words from “and if” onwards were repealed by section 190(3) of, and Part I of Schedule 27 to, the Water Act 1989.

Section 20
This section was repealed by section 190(3) of, and Part I of Schedule 27 to, the Water Act 1989. The proviso to section 20(2) was repealed by section 40(3) of, and Schedule 9 to, the Water Act 1973.

Sections 21 and 22
These sections were repealed by section 3(1) of, and Part I of Schedule 3 to, the Water Consolidation (Consequential Provisions) Act 1991.

Sections 23 and 24
These sections were repealed by section 190(3) of, and Part I of Schedule 27 to, the Water Act 1989.

Section 25
This section was repealed by section 133(2) of, and Schedule 7 to, the Building Act 1984. Section 25(3) was repealed by section 86(3) of, and Part I of the Fifth Schedule to, the Public Health Act 1961.

Section 26
This section was repealed by section 1(3) of the Public Health (Drainage of Trade Premises) Act 1937.

Section 27
This section was repealed by section 3(1) of, and Part I of Schedule 3 to, the Water Consolidation (Consequential Provisions) Act 1991.

Section 28
This section was repealed by section 40(3) of, and Schedule 9 to, the Water Act 1973.

Section 29
This section was repealed by section 190(3) of, and Part I of Schedule 27 to, the Water Act 1989.

Sections 30 and 31
These sections were repealed by section 3(1) of, and Part I of Schedule 3 to, the Water Consolidation (Consequential Provisions) Act 1991.

Section 32
This section was repealed by section 190(3) of, and Part I of Schedule 27 to, the Water Act 1989.

Section 34
This section was repealed by section 3(1) of, and Part I of Schedule 3 to, the Water Consolidation (Consequential Provisions) Act 1991.

Section 35
This section was repealed by section 40(3) of, and Schedule 9 to, the Water Act 1973.

Section 36
This section was repealed by section 3(1) of, and Part I of Schedule 3 to, the Water Consolidation (Consequential Provisions) Act 1991. The words "or by an arbitrator" in section 36(1) were repealed by section 190(3) of, and Part I of Schedule 27 to, the Water Act 1989.

Sections 37 to 40
These sections were repealed by section 133(2) of, and Schedule 7 to, the Building Act 1984.

Section 41
This section was repealed by section 133(2) of, and Schedule 7 to, the Building Act 1984. In section 41(1), the words from the beginning to "this Act" were repealed by section 40(3) of, and Schedule 9 to, the Water Act 1973.

Section 42
This section was repealed by section 3(1) of, and Part I of Schedule 3 to, the Water Consolidation (Consequential Provisions) Act 1991.

Section 43
This section was repealed by section 133(2) of, and Schedule 7 to, the Building Act 1984.

Section 44
This section was repealed by section 133(2) of, and Schedule 7 to, the Building Act 1984. The words "to which section nine of the Factory and Workshop Act, 1901, applies" in section 44(3) were repealed by section 159(1) of, and the Fourth Schedule to, the Factories Act 1937. The words "to a shop to which the Shops Act, 1934, applies, or" in section 44(3) were repealed by section 91(4) of, and Schedule 2 to, the Offices, Shops and Railway Premises Act 1963.

Section 45
The words "to which section nine of the Factory and Workshop Act, 1901, applies" in section 45(4) were repealed by section 159(1) of, and the Fourth Schedule to, the Factories Act 1937. The words "to a shop to which the Shops Act, 1934, applies, or" in section 45(4) were repealed by section 91(4) of, and Schedule 2 to, the Offices, Shops and Railway Premises Act 1963. The words "or workshop" in section 45(4) were repealed by Group 3 of Part XIV of Schedule 1 to the Statute Law (Repeals) Act 1993.

Section 46
This section was repealed by section 133(2) of, and Schedule 7 to, the Building Act 1984. The words "factory, workshop, or" in section 46(1) were repealed by section 159(1) of, and the Fourth Schedule to, the Factories Act 1937. Section 46(4) was repealed by section 91(4) of, and Schedule 2 to, the Offices, Shops and Railway Premises Act 1963. Section 46(5) was repealed by section 159(1) of, and the Fourth Schedule to, the Factories Act 1937.

Section 47
This section was repealed by section 133(2) of, and Schedule 7 to, the Building Act 1984.

Section 48
The words "directly or" in section 48(1) were repealed by section 3(1) of, and Part I of Schedule 3 to, the Water Consolidation (Consequential Provisions) Act 1991. Section 48(1A) was repealed by section 3(1) of, and Part I of Schedule 3 to, the Water Consolidation (Consequential Provisions) Act 1991.

Section 50
The words "or the water authority for the area" in section 50(1) were repealed by section 190(3) of, and Part I of Schedule 27 to, the Water Act 1989.

Section 61
The word "estimates" in section 61(2) was repealed by section 86(3) of, and Part I of the Fifth Schedule to, the Public Health Act 1961. Section 61(3) was repealed by section 86(3) of, and Part I of the Fifth Schedule to, the Public Health Act 1961.

Sections 53 to 57
These sections were repealed by section 133(2) of, and Schedule 7 to, the Building Act 1984.

Section 58
This section was repealed by section 133(2) of, and Schedule 7 to, the Building Act 1984. In section 58(1), the words from "to persons in the building" to the end of the first paragraph (b), the words "in the first-mentioned case", and paragraph (ii), were repealed by section 86(3) of, and Part II of the Fifth Schedule to, the Public Health Act 1961. Section 58(3) was repealed by section 86(3) of, and Part II of the Fifth Schedule to, the Public Health Act 1961.

Sections 59 to 62
These sections were repealed by section 133(2) of, and Schedule 7 to, the Building Act 1984.

Section 63
This section was repealed by section 86(3) of, and Part I of the Fifth Schedule to, the Public Health Act 1961.

Sections 64 to 65
These sections were repealed by section 133(2) of, and Schedule 7 to, the Building Act 1984.

Section 66
This section was repealed by section 133(2) of, and Schedule 7 to, the Building Act 1984. Section 66(1)(a) was repealed by section 86(3) of, and Part II of the Fifth Schedule to, the Public Health Act 1961. Sections 66(2) and (3) were repealed by section 86(3) of, and Part I of the Fifth Schedule to, the Public Health Act 1961.

Section 67
This section was repealed by section 133(2) of, and Schedule 7 to, the Building Act 1984.

Sections 68 and 69
These sections were repealed by section 86(3) of, and Part I of the Fifth Schedule to, the Public Health Act 1961.

Section 70
This section was repealed by section 133(2) of, and Schedule 7 to, the Building Act 1984. Section 70(1)(a) and (b) were repealed by section 272(1) of, and Schedule 30 to, the Local Government Act 1972. In section 70(1)(b), the words from the beginning to "thirty-one, and", the words "or section fifteen of the Public Health Acts Amendment Act, 1907", and the words "in question", were repealed by section 86(3) of, and Part I of the Fifth Schedule to, the Public Health Act 1961.

Section 71
This section was repealed by section 133(2) of, and Schedule 7 to, the Building Act 1984. Section 70(1)(b) was repealed by section 272(1) of, and Schedule 30 to, the Local Government Act 1972.

Sections 72 to 76
These sections were repealed by section 108(2) of, and Schedule 4 to, the Control of Pollution Act 1974.

Section 77
In section 77(2)(b), the words from "or, in case of dispute" to the end were repealed by section 272(1) of, and Schedule 30 to, the Local Government Act 1972.

Sections 79 and 80
These sections are repealed by section 108(2) of, and Schedule 4 to, the Control of Pollution Act 1974.

Section 87
The words "or community" in section 87(1) were repealed by section 126(2) of, and paragraph 1(2)(b) of Schedule 4 to, the Public Health (Wales) Act 2017. The words "other than urinals" in section 87(3)(c) were repealed by article 3 of the Sex Discrimination (Amendment of Legislation) Regulations 2008 (SI 2008/963).

Section 88
This section was repealed by section 133(2) of, and Schedule 7 to, the Building Act 1984.

Section 89
This section was repealed by section 81(1) of, and Schedule 2 to, the Local Government (Miscellaneous Provisions) Act 1976.

Section 90
The definition of sewerage authority in section 90(1) was repealed by section 40(3) of, and Schedule 9 to, the Water Act 1973. Section 90(3) was repealed by section 133(2) of, and Schedule 7 to, the Building Act 1984. In section 90(4), the words from "and any reference" onwards, repealed by section 3(1) of, and Part I of Schedule 3 to, the Water Consolidation (Consequential Provisions) Act 1991. Section 90(5) was repealed by section 3(1) of, and Part I of Schedule 3 to, the Water Consolidation (Consequential Provisions) Act 1991. Section 90(6) was repealed by section 133(2) of, and Schedule 7 to, the Building Act 1984.

References
Dougall Meston. The Public Health Act, 1936, with an Introduction, Notes, Incorporated Enactments, and Index. Sweet & Maxwell Ltd. London. 1937. Catalogue. Reviewed at Annual Survey of English Law 1937, p 81.
Harold Beck Williams. The Public Health Act, 1936. Butterworth & Co (Publishers). London. 1937. Reviewed at Annual Survey of English Law 1937, p 81; (1938) 5 Labour 46; Arnold Pallister (1937) 17 The Town Planning Review 218
Ethel Bright Ashford (ed). Glen's Public Health Act, 1936, being the Fifteenth Edition of Glen's Public Health. Eyre and Spottiswoode. London. 1936. Catalogue. Reviewed at Annual Survey of English Law 1937, p 81.
David Joy Beattie. The Public Health Act 1936. Foreword by Gwilym Gibbon. The Solicitors' Law Stationery Society, Limited. London, Liverpool and Birmingham. 1937. Google Books.
Harry Samuels and Philip Fores. The Public Health Act, 1936. Sir Isaac Pitman & Sons, Ltd. London. 1938. Google Books.
Halsbury's Statutes. Third Edition. Volume 26. Page 189.

External links
The Public Health Act  1936, as amended from the National Archives.
The Public Health Act  1936, as originally enacted from the National Archives.

United Kingdom Acts of Parliament 1936